As of 2006, Liberia has the highest population growth rate in the world (4.50% per annum). 43.5% of Liberians were below the age of 15 in 2010. With recent civil wars being fought along ethnic lines, Liberia is a multiethnic and multicultural country.

Population

This is compared to 911,000 in 1950.

43.5% of Liberians were below the age of 15 in 2010. 53.7% were between 15 and 65 years of age, while 2.8% were 65 years or older.

As of 2006, Liberia has the highest population growth rate in the world (4.50% per annum).

Estimates of Liberia's population prior to the 20th century are unreliable due to the lack of historical censuses. Estimates by scholars of pre-World War II demographics in Liberia differ wildly.

Population by Sex and Age Group (Census 21.III.2008):

Vital statistics
Registration of vital events is in Liberia not complete. The Population Departement of the United Nations prepared the following estimates.

Fertility and births
Total Fertility Rate (TFR) (Wanted Fertility Rate) and Crude Birth Rate (CBR):

Fertility data as of 2013 (DHS Program):

Ethnic communities of Liberia

Indigenous
The indigenous ethnic groups of Liberia can be linguistically divided into three groups who speak;

 The isolate Gola language and the
 Mel languages (particularly Kissi) in the east and
 Kru languages (particularly Bassa) in the west

to which must be added the immigrant communities;

 Mande-Fu (Kpelle, Gio, Mano, Loma)
 Mande-Tan (Vai, Mende, Mandingo)
 Repatriated (Americo-Liberians, Congo, Caribbean)

The Gola ethnic group originated somewhere in central Africa.  During the Empire of Ancient Ghana they were involved in the land-surveying and jurisprudence of the empire.

The other ethnic groups that fall under the Mande-Tan, Mande-Fu were also members of Ancient Ghana.  Because of their influence in the judicial aspects of the Ghana, the Gola's social structure dominated through the Poro.

With the influx of Islam many groups adopted it while others resisted. The Golas fought three wars with pro-Islamic elements in a changing Ghana. These wars were known as the Kumba Wars. The Golas lost the third of these wars and were forced to retreat toward Sierra Leone.  They were pursued by the Mende, Gbandi and Loma. Their battles with the Mende in Sierra Leone forced them to retreat yet again and settle finally in Liberia where they encountered the Dei.

Immigrants from Mali
The Kpelle, Gio, Mano, Mandingo and Vai groups migrated from the Empire of Mali for various reasons, some escaping political intrigue, others looking for a better life. The Vais, settled in Grand Cape Mount county in the west of Liberia, were the first to invent a form of writing in 1833 or 1834. The reported inventor was Dwalu Bukele of Bandakor along the Robertsport (provincial capital) highway.

Immigrants from Côte d'Ivoire
In the 16th century;  Kru (Tajuasohn), Bassa, Belleh, Krahn, Grebo.

19th century
Americo-Liberians: Free black people and emancipated slaves, and their descendants, from the U.S. and the Caribbean
Congos is an eponymic term for "recaptives," people rescued from slave ships after the slave trade, not slavery itself, was abolished by Great Britain and the United States. These people were "repatriated" to Liberia (and Sierra Leone if rescued by the British) and their descendants. The term was used because many of these rescued Africans were thought to be from the Congo River Basin.

Immigrants from Lebanon
In the late 19th century to early 20th century Lebanese merchants, families and businessmen began arriving in Liberia. Lebanese currently own many major businesses such as supermarkets, restaurants, textiles, construction works, factories and other production based companies across the country. Despite living in the country, Lebanese are denied citizenship rights due to Liberia's nationality law and are seen in a political view as foreigners.

Religion

 
According to the 2008 National Census, 85.5% of Liberia's  population practices Christianity. Muslims comprise 12.2% of the population, largely coming from the Mandingo and Vai ethnic groups. The vast majority of Muslims are Malikite Sunni, with sizeable Shia and Ahmadiyya minorities. Traditional indigenous religions are practiced by 0.5% of the population, while 1.8% subscribe to no religion.

Other demographic statistics 
Demographic statistics according to the World Population Review in 2022.

One birth every 3 minutes	
One death every 14 minutes	
One net migrant every 103 minutes	
Net gain of one person every 4 minutes

The following demographic are from the CIA World Factbook unless otherwise indicated.

Population
5,358,483 (2022 est.)
4,809,768 (July 2018 est.)

Religions
Christian 85.6%, Muslim 12.2%, Traditional 0.6%, other 0.2%, none 1.5% (2008 est.)

Age structure

0-14 years: 43.35% (male 1,111,479/female 1,087,871)
15-24 years: 20.35% (male 516,136/female 516,137)
25-54 years: 30.01% (male 747,983/female 774,615)
55-64 years: 3.46% (male 89,150/female 86,231)
65 years and over: 2.83% (male 70,252/female 73,442) (2020 est.)

0-14 years: 43.72% (male 1,062,766 /female 1,040,211)
15-24 years: 19.9% (male 478,041 /female 478,999)
25-54 years: 30.1% (male 711,963 /female 735,878)
55-64 years: 3.43% (male 84,474 /female 80,410)
65 years and over: 2.85% (male 67,229 /female 69,797) (2018 est.)

Birth rate
36.64 births/1,000 population (2022 est.) Country comparison to the world: 11th
37.9 births/1,000 population (2018 est.) Country comparison to the world: 10th

Death rate
6.62 deaths/1,000 population (2022 est.) Country comparison to the world: 131st
7.4 deaths/1,000 population (2018 est.) Country comparison to the world: 116th

Total fertility rate
4.79 children born/woman (2022 est.) Country comparison to the world: 13th
5 children born/woman (2018 est.) Country comparison to the world: 13th

Median age
total: 18 years. Country comparison to the world: 215th
male: 17.7 years
female: 18.2 years (2020 est.)

total: 17.8 years. Country comparison to the world: 217th
male: 17.6 years 
female: 18.1 years (2018 est.)

Population growth rate
2.73% (2022 est.) Country comparison to the world: 16th
2.59% (2018 est.) Country comparison to the world: 19th

Mother's mean age at first birth
19.1 years (2019/20 est.)
note: median age at first birth among women 25-49

19.2 years (2013 est.)
note: median age at first birth among women 25-29

Contraceptive prevalence rate
24.9% (2019/20)
31% (2016)

Net migration rate
-2.74 migrant(s)/1,000 population (2022 est.) Country comparison to the world: 176th
-4.7 migrant(s)/1,000 population (2018 est.) Country comparison to the world: 192nd

Dependency ratios
total dependency ratio: 83.2 (2015 est.)
youth dependency ratio: 77.6 (2015 est.)
elderly dependency ratio: 5.5 (2015 est.)
potential support ratio: 18.1 (2015 est.)

Urbanization
urban population: 53.1% of total population (2022)
rate of urbanization: 3.41% annual rate of change (2015-20 est.)

urban population: 51.2% of total population (2018)
rate of urbanization: 3.41% annual rate of change (2015-20 est.)

Sex ratio
at birth:
1.03 male(s)/female
under 15 years:
1.02 male(s)/female
15–64 years:
1.01 male(s)/female
65 years and over:
0.96 male(s)/female
total population:1 male(s)/female (2018 est.)

Life expectancy at birth

total population: 65.45 years. Country comparison to the world: 201st
male: 63.19 years
female: 67.78 years (2022 est.)

total population: 63.8 years (2018 est.)
male: 61.6 years (2018 est.)
female: 66 years (2018 est.)

total population: 57 years (2011 est.)
male: 55.44 years
female: 58.6 years

Major infectious diseases
degree of risk: very high (2020)
food or waterborne diseases: bacterial and protozoal diarrhea, hepatitis A, and typhoid fever
vectorborne diseases: malaria, dengue fever, and yellow fever
water contact diseases: schistosomiasis
animal contact diseases: rabies
aerosolized dust or soil contact diseases: Lassa fever

note: on 21 March 2022, the US Centers for Disease Control and Prevention (CDC) issued a Travel Alert for polio in Africa; Liberia is currently considered a high risk to travelers for circulating vaccine-derived polioviruses (cVDPV); vaccine-derived poliovirus (VDPV) is a strain of the weakened poliovirus that was initially included in oral polio vaccine (OPV) and that has changed over time and behaves more like the wild or naturally occurring virus; this means it can be spread more easily to people who are unvaccinated against polio and who come in contact with the stool or respiratory secretions, such as from a sneeze, of an “infected” person who received oral polio vaccine; the CDC recommends that before any international travel, anyone unvaccinated, incompletely vaccinated, or with an unknown polio vaccination status should complete the routine polio vaccine series; before travel to any high-risk destination, CDC recommends that adults who previously completed the full, routine polio vaccine series receive a single, lifetime booster dose of polio vaccine

Ethnic groups

There are officially 17 ethnic groups that make up Liberia's indigenous African population, making up maybe 95% of the total: Kpelle, the largest group; Bassa, Gio, Kru, Grebo, Mandingo, Mano, Krahn, Gola, Gbandi, Loma, Kissi, Vai, Sapo, Belleh (Kuwaa), Mende and Dey.

There are also more or less nomadic groups like the Fula, who engage mostly in trade, and the Fanti, who are often fishermen or traders of fish, usually from Ghana, living seasonally and more and more often permanently in Liberia.

Then there are Americo-Liberians, who are descendants of free-born and formerly enslaved African Americans who arrived in Liberia from 1822 onward and Congo People (descendants of immigrants from the Caribbean), making up an estimated 5% of the population. They used to dominate political life in Liberia and still have a lot of influence.

There are about 5,000 people of European descent, many of them having settled down as miners, missionaries, business people, and so on. There also is a sizeable number of Lebanese, Indians, and other people with Asian roots who make up a significant part of Liberia's business community. Because of the civil war and its accompanying problem of insecurity, the number of non-Africans in Liberia is low and confined largely to Monrovia and its immediate surroundings.

The Liberian Constitution restricts citizenship of Liberia only to people who are either 'Negroes or of Negro descent' wherein the Liberian Constitution / Chapter 4 / Article 27b states: "In order to preserve, foster and maintain the positive Liberian culture, values and character, only persons who are Negroes or of Negro descent shall qualify by birth or by naturalization to be citizens of Liberia."

Languages

English 20% (official), some 20 ethnic group languages, of which a few can be written and are used in correspondence.

Literacy
definition: age 15 and over can read and write (2015 est.)
total population: 48.3%
male: 62.7%
female: 34.1% (2017)

total population: 47.6% (2015 est.)
male: 62.4% (2015 est.)
female: 32.8% (2015 est.)

Unemployment, youth ages 15-24
total: 2.3% (2016 est.)
male: 2.4% (2016 est.)
female: 2.2% (2016 est.)

See also
Liberia
List of countries by population growth rate

References

Bibliography
Ciment, J. (2013) Another America: The Story of Liberia and the Former Slaves Who Ruled It. New York: Hill and Wang. 
Clegg, C. (2004). The Price of Liberty: African Americans and the Making of Liberia. Chapel Hill: UNC Press. 
Sundiata, I. (2003) Brothers and Strangers: Black Zion, Black Slavery, 1914-1940. Durham: Duke University Press

External links

 Liberia: Nation & People without identity
 The Indigenous & Americo Liberians' Palva
 Liberia, "America's step child" searches for own identity
 Words Matter: Terms of Global Conflicts debated, NPR
 Contemporary Africa & Legacy of late colonialism
 How the word ‘tribe’ stereotypes Africa